Ajdin Nukić (born 26 December 1997) is a Bosnian professional footballer who plays as a right-back for FK Tuzla City and the Bosnia and Herzegovina national team.

International career
He made his debut for Bosnia and Herzegovina national football team on 6 June 2021 in a friendly against Denmark. He substituted Andrej Đokanović in 78th minute of a 0–2 away loss. He became the first player to represent FK Tuzla City in the national team.

References

External links
 
 

1997 births
Sportspeople from Tuzla
Living people
Bosnia and Herzegovina footballers
Bosnia and Herzegovina international footballers
Association football midfielders
FK Tuzla City players
Premier League of Bosnia and Herzegovina players
First League of the Federation of Bosnia and Herzegovina players